Caledonia was a former town in Cass Township, Sullivan County, in the U.S. state of Indiana.

History
Extensive strip mining in the area caused the town of Caledonia to become extinct.

A post office was established at Caledonia in 1902, and operated until it was discontinued in 1909.

Geography

References

Ghost towns in Indiana
Terre Haute metropolitan area